James Allan Ball (7 May 1903 – 2 July 1988) was a Canadian sprint runner who competed at the 1928 and 1932 Olympics. He won a bronze medal in the 4 × 400 m relay at both Games. Individually, he finished second in the 400 m in 1928 and was eliminated in the preliminaries in 1932. At the 1930 Empire Games he won a silver medal with the Canadian team in the 4×440 yards relay. He also finished fifth in the 220 yard and in 440 yard races.

Ball had a degree in pharmacy from the University of Manitoba. In 1927 he won national titles in the 440 yards and in the mile relay. Next year he won the Olympic trials setting a national record in the 400 m at 48.6 seconds. He improved that record to 48.0 seconds at the 1928 Games. In 1933 he earned the Norton H. Crowe trophy and won his second national title in the mile relay. He retired in 1935 after winning a third title in this event.

Ball was inducted to Canada’s Sports Hall of Fame in 1959 and to the Manitoba Sports Hall of Fame and Museum in 1980.

References
 
 Canadian Olympic Committee
 Jimmy Ball’s biography at Manitoba Sports Hall of Fame and Museum

1903 births
1988 deaths
Canadian male sprinters
Olympic track and field athletes of Canada
Athletes (track and field) at the 1928 Summer Olympics
Athletes (track and field) at the 1932 Summer Olympics
Olympic silver medalists for Canada
Olympic bronze medalists for Canada
Athletes (track and field) at the 1930 British Empire Games
Commonwealth Games silver medallists for Canada
Canadian people of English descent
University of Manitoba alumni
Sportspeople from Dauphin, Manitoba
Commonwealth Games medallists in athletics
Medalists at the 1928 Summer Olympics
Medalists at the 1932 Summer Olympics
Olympic silver medalists in athletics (track and field)
Olympic bronze medalists in athletics (track and field)
Medallists at the 1930 British Empire Games